For the Summer Olympics, there are 28 venues that have been or will be used for rowing. These venues have occurred at lakes, rivers, shipping canals, and their own specialized courses. The first specialized course took place at 1932 and would serve as a model for other Olympic venues, most notably in 1972, 1976, 1980, 2000, 2004, 2008 and 2012.

References

 
Venues
Row
Olympic venues